Amakom is a suburb of Kumasi in the Ashanti Region of Ghana.

References

Populated places in the Ashanti Region